Tales of Captain Black is an album by American guitarist James Blood Ulmer (credited simply as "James Blood" on the cover) featuring Ornette Coleman, Jamaaladeen Tacuma, and Denardo Coleman recorded in 1978 and originally released on the Artists House label. The album was remastered and rereleased on CD with a new mix by Joe Ferla approved and co-produced by Ulmer on the Japanese DIW label in 1996.

Reception
The AllMusic review by Thom Jurek awarded the album 5 stars, and states, "Safe to say, there are no weak tracks on Tales From Captain Black, and even the redo of "Revealing" from Ulmer's previous album show an unbridled excitement and an extrapolation of that tune's rhythmic and harmonic elements into something more sinister, more driven, more angular, more mercurial. Captain Black marks the real beginning of Ulmer's career as a leader. It has been a bumpy, restless ride since that time with many creative and professional ups and downs, but it hardly matters. Records like this one make him the most visionary and brilliant electric guitarist in a generation".  

Trouser Press wrote, "Ulmer's debut finds him heavily indebted to the saxophonist. Tales of Captain Black offers Ulmer's trademark knotted, choked phrasing as a rough-hewn foil to Coleman's pure, free melodocism, but he hasn't fully discovered his own voice yet."

Track listing
All compositions by James Blood Ulmer
 "Theme from Captain Black" - 3:14
 "Moons Shine" - 3:52
 "Morning Bride" - 4:57
 "Revelation March" - 4:32
 "Woman Coming" - 3:38
 "Nothing to Say" - 4:13
 "Arena" - 4:24
 "Revealing" - 4:42
Recorded at R.P.M. Sound Studios, Inc., New York City, December 5, 1978.

Personnel
James Blood Ulmer - guitar
Ornette Coleman – alto saxophone
Jamaaladeen Tacuma - electric bass
Denardo Coleman - drums

References

Artists House albums
DIW Records albums
James Blood Ulmer albums
1979 albums